Tero Välimäki (born 21 March 1982) is a Finnish Greco-Roman wrestler. He competed in the men's Greco-Roman 66 kg event at the 2016 Summer Olympics, in which he was eliminated in the round of 16 by Shmagi Bolkvadze.

References

External links
 

1982 births
Living people
Finnish male sport wrestlers
Olympic wrestlers of Finland
Wrestlers at the 2016 Summer Olympics